N49 may refer to:
 N49 (Long Island bus)
 Escadrille N.49, a unit of the French Air Force
 LMC N49, a supernova remnant the Large Magellanic Cloud
 , a minesweeper of the Royal Norwegian Navy